Elections to Oxford City Council were held on 10 June 2004. The council is elected by halves, so one seat in each ward was up for election (except in St Clements, where both seats were contested). Labour lost majority control of the council but remained in minority administration. Overall turnout was 37.6%, with the lowest turnout (26.5%) in Carfax ward and the highest (49.5%) in Wolvercote.

Election result

|}
Note: three Independents stood in 2004, compared with one in 2002.

The total number of seats on the Council after the election was:
Labour - 20
Liberal Democrats - 18
Green - 7
Independent Working Class Association - 3

Sources: BBC Oxford City Council

Results by ward

All results from Oxford City Council.

Barton and Sandhills

Blackbird Leys

Carfax

Churchill

Cowley

Cowley Marsh

Headington

Headington Hill and Northway

Hinksey Park

Holywell

Iffley Fields

Jericho and Osney

Littlemore

Lye Valley

Marston

North

*John Rose stood on the platform "Local Government Reform"

Northfield Brook

Quarry and Risinghurst

Rose Hill and Iffley

St Clement's

Because both seats were up for election each voter had two votes (i.e. plurality-at-large). Turnout has been estimated by halving the number of votes cast.

St Margaret's

St Mary's

Summertown

Wolvercote

2004 English local elections
2004
2000s in Oxford